The 2017–18 Baltimore Blast season is the twenty-sixth season of the Baltimore Blast professional indoor soccer club. The Blast, an Eastern Division team in the Major Arena Soccer League, play their home games at SECU Arena in Towson, Maryland.

The team is led by owner Edwin F. Hale, Sr. and head coach Danny Kelly. The Blast entered the season as defending champions as they defeated the Sonora Suns in the Ron Newman Cup finals in April 2017 for the second consecutive season.

Following a 6-5 victory on February 10 over the Milwaukee Wave, Baltimore clinched a playoff berth in the Eastern Division for the 2018 Ron Newman Cup playoffs. The Blast then clinched the regular-season Eastern Division championship after an 8-7 overtime win over the Florida Tropics on February 24. The Blast finished the regular season 17-5 and defeated Syracuse, Milwaukee and Monterrey in the postseason, successfully defending their title en route to the team's tenth championship (including one won by the original Blast franchise). William Vanzela received the MASL Final MVP.

History
Launched in July 1992 as the Baltimore Spirit, an expansion team in the second National Professional Soccer League for the 1992–93 season, the team replaced the original Baltimore Blast which folded earlier in 1992 when the first Major Indoor Soccer League shut down. Ed Hale, an owner of the original Blast, bought the Spirit in July 1998 and changed the name to Baltimore Blast. In 2001, the team was a founding member of the second MISL. When that league shut down in 2008, they co-founded the National Indoor Soccer League which, one season later, became the third MISL.

After the 2013-14 season, Baltimore was one of three teams that left the MISL, leading to the league's collapse. Along with five other former MISL teams, the Blast joined the teams of the Professional Arena Soccer League, which was then rebranded as the Major Arena Soccer League. The MASL Eastern Division for the 2017-18 season remains unchanged from the previous season, consisting of the defending MASL Ron Newman Cup Champion Baltimore Blast, former MISL club Syracuse Silver Knights, former PASL club Harrisburg Heat, and the Florida Tropics.

Off-field moves
The Blast announced in August 2017 that they would move from the Royal Farms Arena to the SECU Arena on the campus of Towson University, beginning in the 2017-2018 MASL season. The move will be the first time the Blast franchise will play home games in an arena other than the Royal Farms Arena.

Schedule

Regular season

Post-season

Personnel

2017–18 roster

Active Players
As of March 6, 2018

Inactive Players

Staff
The team's coaching staff includes head coach Danny Kelly, assistant coach David Bascome, athletic trainer Heather Kohlbus, physical therapist Paul Ernst, team doctor Dr. Richard Levine, and equipment manager Mark Meszaros. The Blast front office includes owner Edwin F. Hale, Sr., team president and general manager Kevin Healey, and assistant general manager Mike Conway.

Statistics

Top scorers

Last updated on March 6, 2018. Source:

External links
Baltimore Blast official website
Baltimore Blast at The Baltimore Sun

References

Baltimore Blast
2017–18 Major Arena Soccer League season
2010s in Baltimore
2018 in sports in Maryland
2017 in sports in Maryland